John Caplyn (by 1516–1568/70), of Southampton, was an English politician.

Family
Caplyn was the father of John Caplyn, MP for Gloucester.

Career
He was a Member (MP) of the Parliament of England for Bodmin in 1547 and 1553 and for Southampton in 1563.

References

16th-century deaths
Members of the Parliament of England for Bodmin
Members of the Parliament of England for Southampton
English MPs 1547–1552
English MPs 1553 (Edward VI)
English MPs 1563–1567
Year of birth uncertain